Yedian may refer to:

Night Inn (夜店), 1947 Chinese film
One Night in Supermarket (夜·店), 2009 Chinese film
Yedian, Shandong (野店), a town in Mengyin County, Shandong, China